The 2022–23 Maltese Challenge League (referred to as the BOV Challenge League for sponsorship reasons) is the second-level league football in Malta. It is the third season that the competition has been running in its present form.

Team changes 
The following teams have changed division since the 2021–22 season:

To Maltese Challenge League 
Promoted from Maltese National Amateur League
Żurrieq
Attard
Marsaskala
Mtarfa

Relegated from the Maltese Premier League
Sliema Wanderers

From Maltese Challenge League 
Promoted to the Maltese Premier League
 Marsaxlokk
 Pietà Hotspurs
 Żebbuġ Rangers

Relegated to Maltese National Amateur League
 Luqa St. Andrew's
 Mġarr United
 Pembroke Athleta
 Rabat Ajax F.C.
 Senglea Athletic
 St. George's

Teams 

Eighteen teams will compete in the league which will include the Four teams promoted from the Amateur League and one team relegated from the Premier League. This Season will be playing only one round. After the first round, the top six will play each other twice to determine whether to win the Challenge League, be promoted, or stay in Challenge League next season. And those who finish seventh till eighteenth in the first round will play once in Play-Out to determine who will stay in Challenge League or have either been relegated.

Venues

League table
<onlyinclude>

Results

Second phase

Top Six

Play-Out

Season statistics

Top scorers

Hat-tricks 

Notes
4 Player scored 4 goals

Clean sheets

Discipline

Club
 Most yellow cards: 69
Mqabba
 Most red cards: 5
Marsa
Mtarfa

References

External links
Malta Football Association

2022–23 in European second tier association football leagues
2022–23 in Maltese football
Malta, 2